Turn to Me is a compilation album released by Vanessa Amorosi in 2001. The packaging contains bonus multi-media components "Have a Look" (German video), "Shine" (UK video) and a hidden video of "The Power" (Oz Outtakes) which is not credited on the insert. Also included is a photo gallery and screen saver.

Turn to Me contained both new original tracks (Tracks 1, 2, 4, 6, 8, 9, 10) as well as a compilation of tracks that were unreleased in Australia along with remixes of popular songs from both "Turn to Me" and "The Power". It also includes Vanessa's new cover of "Get Here", which she first covered as a promotional single in 1998 for Sydney Central Plaza.

Chart performance
Turn to Me peaked at number 21 on the Australian Albums Chart.

Track listing

Charts

Release history

References

Vanessa Amorosi albums
2001 compilation albums
Compilation albums by Australian artists
Pop albums by Australian artists